The East Caucasian tur (Capra cylindricornis), also known as the Daghestani tur,  is a mountain-dwelling caprine living in the eastern half of the Greater Caucasus mountains, in Azerbaijan, Georgia, and European Russia. It inhabits rough mountainous terrain, where it eats mainly grasses and leaves. It is listed as near threatened on the IUCN Red List.

Description
East Caucasian turs are goat-like animals with large but narrow bodies and short legs, and show significant sexual dimorphism in overall size and horn development.

The summer coat is short and sandy-yellow, with dirty white underparts. Also, dark brown stripes occur along the front surface of the legs and on the upper surface of the tail. In the winter, the coats of females and juvenile males becomes slightly greyish in colour, but otherwise remain similar. However, the winter coats of adult males are a solid dark brown, without visible stripes on the legs. Compared with other goats, the beards of East Caucasian turs are relatively stiff, and project somewhat forwards, rather than drooping down. The beard is small or entirely absent in females, and in males in their summer coats.

Distribution and habitat
The western edge of the range of the East Caucasian tur remains unclear, as it overlaps with that of West Caucasian tur (Capra caucasica). Most of the species populations avoid human disturbance and occur in extremely rugged, open terrain around 3,000 m. In areas with no or little human disturbance, turs occur in gentler and much lower terrain. The species is heat-sensitive but prefers snow-free, grass-dominated areas near escape cliffs, and in terrain that is difficult for humans and livestock to reach. A fragment of a land with optimal terrain, climate, and degree of human disturbance for the species' occurrence is more likely to contain the species if the area of the fragment is larger and its distance to the species' nearest source population is shorter.

Behaviour and ecology

Reproduction
Breeding occurs from late November to early January, with births taking place in May and June, after a gestation period of 160 to 165 days. Newborn turs weigh ; they are usually singletons, although about 3% of pregnancies result in twin births. Young turs are extremely agile, being able to scamper about steep slopes after only a day of life. They generally start sampling grasses after one month, but continue to suckle until about December. Growth is relatively slow, with females not reaching their full adult size for five years, and males at around 10 or 11 years of age. Females reach sexual maturity at two years, but, in the wild, usually do not breed until the age of four.

East Caucasian turs are able to cross-breed with West Caucasian turs and with domestic goats, producing fertile offspring, although this is not common in the wild.

Diet
During the warm months, feeding occurs at intervals throughout the late afternoon, night, and morning, with the hottest hours of the day being spent resting in sheltered places. In winter, herds may remain in open pastures throughout the day, alternately grazing and resting. Daily movements may cover . They eat almost all kinds of available vegetation, but prefer forbs in spring and summer, and grasses, trees, and shrubs in autumn and winter.

The adult males generally inhabit higher altitudes than females and their young, descending to join them in the breeding season. During the summer, the turs also make daily migrations, moving as much as  vertically between feeding meadows and night-time resting spots.

During this rut, vigorous competitions arise as males vie for mating rights. Older males are dominant over younger ones, which they drive away from females using threatening postures, rushing, and occasional clashes with their horns. Fights between equally sized males are fiercer, beginning with both animals rearing on their hind legs and butting each other, before vigorous horn-wrestling that often results in the combatants rolling down steep slopes until one submits and leaves the group. During the rut, males also mark their territory by debarking and scent-marking tree trunks and heavy branches.

Outside of the rutting season, females live in stable groups with an average of seven individuals, often including a few juvenile males. Older males live in larger, single-sex groups, with an average of 12 members, while some younger males travel in groups of two or three. These male groups break up around November, when the rut begins and mixed-sex groups become the norm, reforming again in January or February.

References

External links 
 Brent Huffman, 2004, www.ultimateungulate.com

Capra (genus)
Mammals of Western Asia
Mammals of Azerbaijan
Mammals of Russia
Mammals of Europe
Taxa named by Edward Blyth
Mammals described in 1841